The Old Morris County Courthouse in Daingerfield, Texas is a historic building built in 1882.  It was listed on the National Register of Historic Places in 1979.  It was later used as the Morris County Museum.

It was the first seat of government in Morris County, Texas, which was split from an adjacent county in 1875.  It is a copy of the courthouse of Franklin County, Texas.

A new courthouse to serve the county was built in 1972.  In 1979, the building served as the headquarters for the Morris County Museum and Historical Society.

See also

National Register of Historic Places listings in Morris County, Texas
List of county courthouses in Texas

References

Museums in Morris County, Texas
History museums in Texas
Courthouses in Texas
Courthouses on the National Register of Historic Places in Texas
National Register of Historic Places in Morris County, Texas
Government buildings completed in 1882